The Play-offs of the 2003 Fed Cup Europe/Africa Zone Group I were the final stages of the Group I Zonal Competition involving teams from Europe and Africa. Those that qualified for this stage placed first and second in their respective pools.

The eight teams were then randomly paired up the team from a different placing of another group for a play-off tie, with the winners being promoted to the World Group Play-offs.

Switzerland vs. Netherlands

  advanced to the World Group Play-offs, where they were drawn against . They won 4–1, and thus advanced to the World Group for next year.

Israel vs. Belarus

  advanced to the World Group Play-offs, where they were drawn against . They lost 1–4, and thus were relegated back to Group I for next year.

South Africa vs. Yugoslavia

  advanced to the World Group Play-offs, where they were drawn against . They lost 1–4, and thus were relegated back to Group I for next year.

Hungary vs. Ukraine

  advanced to the World Group Play-offs, where they were drawn against . They lost 2–3, and thus were relegated back to Group I for next year.

See also
Fed Cup structure

References

External links
 Fed Cup website

2003 Fed Cup Europe/Africa Zone